Peter Howden (born Charles Peter Howden; 21 October 1911 – 6 July 2003) was a New Zealand cricketer. He was a right-handed batsman who played for Otago. He was born and died in Auckland.

Howden made two first-class appearances for the team, during the 1937-38 Plunket Shield season. He scored 11 runs in two innings on his debut, and 52 runs in the two innings in which he batted in his second and final match.

Howden's father, Charles, and uncle, Alister, both played first-class cricket.

See also
 List of Otago representative cricketers

External links
Peter Howden at Cricket Archive

1911 births
2003 deaths
New Zealand cricketers
Otago cricketers
New Zealand people of Scottish descent